The 2011–12 season was Sport Lisboa e Benfica's 108th season in existence and the club's 78th consecutive season in the top flight of Portuguese football. It involved Benfica competing in the Primeira Liga, Taça de Portugal, Taça da Liga and the UEFA Champions League. Benfica qualified for the Champions League by finishing second in the previous Primeira Liga.

In Jesus' third season at the helm of the club, he tried to implement a more balanced system, with Axel Witsel replacing Pablo Aimar as a more central midfielder, with Aimar pushed as to second striker role, to give more defensive support than Javier Saviola. Nicolás Gaitán was moved to the right, with Bruno César and Nolito alternating on the left. Rodrigo eventually gained his space in the starting eleven, replacing Aimar.

This season, Benfica placed first in their UEFA Champions League group, later reaching the competition's quarter-finals, and won their fourth Taça da Liga by defeating Gil Vicente.

Competitions

Pre-season

Primeira Liga

League table

Results by round

Matches

Taça de Portugal

Taça da Liga

Group stage

Knockout phase

UEFA Champions League

Third qualifying round

Play-off round

Group stage

Knockout phase

Round of 16

Quarter-finals

Overall record

Player statistics

|-
! colspan="15" style="background:#dcdcdc; text-align:center;"| Goalkeepers

|-
! colspan="15" style="background:#dcdcdc; text-align:center;"| Defenders

|-
! colspan="15" style="background:#dcdcdc; text-align:center;"| Midfielders

|-
! colspan="15" style="background:#dcdcdc; text-align:center;"| Strikers

|}

Transfers

In

Summer

Winter 

Spend :  €27,050,000

Out

Summer

Winter 

 Transfer income:  €41,150,000

Overall transfer activity

Spending
 Summer:   €27,050,000
 Winter:  €0,000,000
 Total:  €27,050,000

Income
 Summer:  €40,850,000
 Winter:  €300,000
 Total:  €41,150,000

Expenditure
 Summer:  €13,800,000
 Winter:  €300,000
 Total:  €14,100,000

References

S.L. Benfica seasons
Benfica
Benfica